Devaki is a 2019 Indian Kannada-language crime thriller film written and directed by H. Lohith and produced by Akshay C.S. and Ravish R.C. The film was produced under RCS Banner. It stars Priyanka Upendra and Kishore along with Aishwarya Upendra. The supporting cast includes Bollywood actor Sanjeev Jaiswal known for his role in the film – The Attacks of 26/11 . The score is by Nobin Paul, and the cinematography is by H.C. Venu. The film was edited by Ravichandran. The film marks the first appearance of Aishwarya Upendra, opposite her mother.

The film was announced soon after the success of Upendra and Lohith's movie Mummy. This is their second collaboration. The London Economic newspaper cited this movie as one of the examples of Indian thriller movies of 2019 which have the potential to gain global attention due to the absence of songs – which it considered as a staple in Indian movies irrespective of the genre.

Cast 

 Priyanka Upendra as Devaki
 Kishore as Inspector
 Aishwarya Upendra as Devaki's Daughter
 Sanjeev Jaiswal as a kidnapper

Soundtrack 
The film's score was composed by Nobin Paul.

Production
The film was first titled Howrah Bridge. Following the success of actor-director duo in Mummy, Lohith announced his next project with Upendra. Later, her daughter was cast to play a pivotal role. Kishore was signed to the project to play the antagonist.  Three-fourths of the film was shot in Kolkata, with some portions shot in Bengaluru and Mysuru.

Release
The official first look and teaser of the film was released on 13 March 2019. The theatrical trailer debuted on 27 June 2019. The film was released on 5 July 2019.

Home media 
The film was made available to stream on OTT platform Amazon Prime on 21 February 2020.

Critical reception 
The Times of India paper rated the movie 4/5 and wrote that, "Devaki is not the usual outing that one would go to. It can leave one teary-eyed, especially towards the end of the film. If you're looking for an experience that brings in something new, then this is for you." The New Indian Express paper rated the film 4/5 and wrote "In his second outing after Mummy – Save Me, director Lohith has again displayed a shade of the mark of a genius. It is not just perfection that comes to the fore in Devaki, but the opening of new frontiers, inviting the audience to the kingdom of ingenuity. There is not a scintilla of mediocrity in his execution, which is enhanced by Kolkata’s vibrant yet moody aura. A suspense thriller, Devaki is a film about love and loss, told with a lot of sensitivity. A must watch." The Bangalore Mirror said, "Technically, this is one of the better films you have seen." Aravind Shwetha of The News Minute gave three stars out of five and said, "Devaki manages to keep us invested all through. But for its slow pace, this is a film that deserves a watch." Vivek M V of The Deccan Herald gave three and a half out of five stars and noted, "Devaki, after Bell Bottom, is another thriller that deserves a watch in the theatres."

References

External links 

 

2010s Kannada-language films
2019 crime thriller films
Indian crime thriller films
2019 films
Films shot in Mysore
Films shot in Bangalore